Meulaboh (Jawoë: ملابوه; or Moulabouh) is the capital of West Aceh Regency, Indonesia.

Geography 

Meulaboh is about 245 km southeast of Banda Aceh, the capital of Aceh province. Meulaboh is located in the western part of Sumatra island.

2004 Indian Ocean earthquake event 

"The casualty rates in Meulaboh defy imagination," said Aitor Lacomba, Indonesian director of aid group International Rescue Committee. "Tens of thousands need immediate assistance there."

A damaged airstrip was cleared, enabling International Red Cross medical teams from Japan, Spain and Singapore to begin treating survivors. Red Cross engineer Sara Escudero said "There is a strong smell of putrefaction and, whilst body retrieval has commenced, it can be assumed that there are still hundreds, possibly thousands of bodies remaining underneath the debris".

The Red Cross said it would use Meulaboh as an aid staging post for the Sumatran west coast. The government of Singapore deployed two helicopter landing ships there.

The town was largely devastated, with around 80 percent of buildings destroyed and at least 10,000 dead out of the town's population of 50-60 thousand. Only 23,000 people could be accounted for a week after the tsunami, although many were not accounted for as they were not in refugee camps, but resided in deserted houses.

Climate
Meulaboh has a tropical rainforest climate (Af) with heavy to very heavy rainfall year-round.

See also 

 Calang
 Gleebruk
 Leupung
 Tapaktuan
 Teunom

References

External links 
 DigitalGlobe analysis of Meulaboh tsunami images. (For reference only. PDF 1.08 MB)

Populated places in Aceh
Regency seats of Aceh